Ficus andamanica is a species of fig tree in the family Moraceae.

The tree is endemic to the Andaman Islands, a territorial part of India located off the Burmese coast.

It is threatened by habitat loss.

References

Sources

andamanica
Flora of the Andaman Islands
Endangered flora of Asia
Taxonomy articles created by Polbot
Taxa named by E. J. H. Corner